Goephanes pictus is a species of beetle in the family Cerambycidae. It was described by Fairmaire in 1896.

References

Goephanes
Beetles described in 1896
Taxa named by Léon Fairmaire